Guntur West is a constituency in Guntur district of Andhra Pradesh, representing the state legislative assembly in India. It is one of the seven assembly segments of Guntur Lok Sabha constituency, along with Tadikonda, Mangalagiri,  Ponnuru, Tenali and Guntur East. Maddali Giridhara Rao is the present MLA of the constituency, who won the 2019 Andhra Pradesh Legislative Assembly election from Telugu Desam Party and later defected to the YSRC Party. As of 25 March 2019, there a total of 265,135 electors in the constituency.

History 
Earlier called as Guntur-II (Assembly Constituency), it has undergone some minor changes in the Delimitation of Parliamentary and Assembly Constituencies Order, 2008 and was named as Guntur West (Assembly Constituency).

Mandals 
It covers Guntur mandal (Part), Guntur (M.Corp) (Part) and Guntur (M.Corp) – Ward No.1 to 6 and 24 to 28.

List of Members of Legislative Assembly

Guntur West (2009–present)

Guntur-II (1955-2009)

Election results

Guntur West (2009–present)

Assembly elections 2019

Assembly elections 2014

Assembly elections 2009

Guntur-II (1955-2009)

Assembly elections 2004

Assembly elections 1999

Assembly elections 1994

Assembly elections 1989

Assembly elections 1985

Assembly elections 1983

Assembly elections 1978

Assembly elections 1972

Assembly elections 1967

Assembly elections 1962

Assembly elections 1955

See also 
 List of constituencies of Andhra Pradesh Legislative Assembly

References 

Assembly constituencies of Andhra Pradesh
Politics of Guntur